Kamianske is a village (selo) of Ukraine, in Vasylivka Raion, Zaporizhzhia Oblast.

History 

On March 13, 2015, a monument to Vladimir Lenin was demolished in the village.

2022 Russian invasion
By March 2022, Kamianske was near the front line of the southern theatre during the 2022 Russian invasion of Ukraine, and had become the site of prisoner exchanges including that of Melitopol mayor Ivan Fedorov. By May, trenches had been dug near Kamianske.

References 

Villages in Vasylivka Raion